Jess Fink is an American comic book creator known for her webcomic turned graphic novel Chester 5000 XYV and graphic novel We Can Fix It, both published by Top Shelf Comics. Her work has appeared in North American Review among other publications. Fink's erotic comic book work has been featured at the Museum of Sex in New York City and on the Oh Joy Sex Toy web comic and book. Her work is known for being autobiographical in nature or featuring erotic scenes. For example, she described her work, We Can Fix It as "an autobiographical memoir... with a time machine" and has described her work Chester 5000 XYV as "an erotic, robotic, Victorian romance." Chester 5000 XYV is part of the Library of Congress's Webcomics Web Archive.

Biography
In high school, Jess Fink began reading comics and then manga. She cites Molly Kiely and Art Spiegelman as influences. 

In 2003, Fink received her degree in Illustrating & Cartooning from the School of Visual Arts in New York City. During her studies, she was taught by Tom Hart, who assisted her with editing We Can Fix It. 

She currently lives in Troy, NY and sells jewelry through an online store named Hey Chickadee! She has used Kickstarter to fund projects and has a Patreon.

Bibliography

Top Shelf Comics
 Chester 5000 XYV (2011)
 We Can Fix It (2013)

Image Comics
 Adventures Into Mindless Self Indulgence (2010)

Webcomics
 Chester 5000
 Kid With Experience
 We Are Become Pals

Anthologies
 SPX (2002/2003)
 Best Erotic Comics (Last Gasp, 2009)
 Erotic Comics, Volume 2 (Abrams, 2008)
 Popgun (Volume 4, 2010)
 Smut Peddler (2013)

Awards
 2017 Ignatz Award for Outstanding Series - Chester 5000

References

External links
 
 

Living people
American female comics artists
American webcomic creators
School of Visual Arts alumni
Ignatz Award winners for Outstanding Series
Female comics writers
Year of birth missing (living people)